The globe artichoke (Cynara cardunculus var. scolymus ), also known by the names French artichoke and green artichoke in the U.S., is a variety of a species of thistle cultivated as food.

The edible portion of the plant consists of the flower buds before the flowers come into bloom. The budding artichoke flower-head is a cluster of many budding small flowers (an inflorescence), together with many bracts, on an edible base. Once the buds bloom, the structure changes to a coarse, barely edible form. Another variety of the same species is the cardoon, a perennial plant native to the Mediterranean region. Both wild forms and cultivated varieties (cultivars) exist.

Description

The flowers develop in a large head from an edible bud about  diameter with numerous triangular scales; the individual florets are purple. The edible portions of the buds consist primarily of the fleshy lower portions of the involucral bracts and the base, known as the heart; the mass of immature florets in the center of the bud is called the choke or beard. These are inedible in older, larger flowers.

Chemical constituents 
Artichoke contains the bioactive agents apigenin and luteolin.

The total antioxidant capacity of artichoke flower heads is one of the highest reported for vegetables. Cynarine is a chemical constituent in Cynara.  The majority of the cynarine found in artichoke is located in the pulp of the leaves, though dried leaves and stems of artichoke also contain it.

Etymology
The English word artichoke was borrowed in the sixteenth century from the northern Italian word  (the standard modern Italian being ). The Italian term was itself borrowed either from Spanish  (today usually ) or directly from the source of the Spanish word—medieval Andalusi Arabic  (including the Arabic definite article ). The Arabic form  is still used in Maghrebi Arabic today, while other variants in Arabic include , and Modern Standard Arabic . These Arabic forms themselves derive from classical Arabic  singular word of the plural  meaning "scale". Other languages which derive their word for the artichoke from Arabic include Israeli Hebrew, which has the word .

Despite being borrowed from Arabic, European terms for the artichoke have in turn influenced Arabic in their own right. This literally means 'earthy thorny', and is an Arabicisation (through phono-semantic matching) of the English word artichoke or other European terms like it.

As in the case of Levantine Arabic , names for the artichoke have frequently changed form due to folk etymology and phono-semantic matching. Forms found in English have included hartichoak, corresponding to heart and choke, which were likely associated with the belief that the inedible centre of the vegetable could choke its eaters or that the plant can take over a garden, choking out other plants.

Early history of use
The artichoke is a domesticated variety of the wild cardoon (Cynara cardunculus), which is native to the Mediterranean area. There was debate over whether the artichoke was a food among the ancient Greeks and Romans, or whether that cultivar was developed later, with Classical sources referring instead to the wild cardoon. The cardoon is mentioned as a garden plant in the eighth century BCE by Homer and Hesiod. Pliny the Elder mentioned growing of 'carduus' in Carthage and Cordoba. In North Africa, where it is still found in the wild state, the seeds of artichokes, probably cultivated, were found during the excavation of Roman-period Mons Claudianus in Egypt. Varieties of artichokes were cultivated in Sicily beginning in the classical period of the ancient Greeks; the Greeks calling them kaktos. In that period, the Greeks ate the leaves and flower heads, which cultivation had already improved from the wild form. The Romans called the vegetable carduus (hence the name cardoon). Further improvement in the cultivated form appears to have taken place in the medieval period in Muslim Spain and the Maghreb, although the evidence is inferential only. By the twelfth century, it was being mentioned in the compendious guide to farming composed by Ibn al-'Awwam in Seville (though it does not appear in earlier major Andalusian Arabic works on agriculture), and in Germany by Hildegard von Bingen.

Le Roy Ladurie, in his book Les Paysans de Languedoc, has documented the spread of artichoke cultivation in Italy and southern France in the late fifteenth and early sixteenth centuries, when the artichoke appeared as a new arrival with a new name, which may be taken to indicate an arrival of an improved cultivated variety:

The Dutch introduced artichokes to England, where they grew in Henry VIII's garden at Newhall in 1530. From the mid-17th century artichokes 'enjoyed a vogue' in European courts. The hearts were considered luxury ingredients in the new court cookery as recorded by writers such as François Pierre La Varenne, the author of Le Cuisinier François (1651). It was also claimed, in this period, that artichokes had aphrodisiac properties. They were taken to the United States in the nineteenth century—to Louisiana by French immigrants and to California by Spanish immigrants.

Agricultural output

Cultivation of the globe artichoke is concentrated in the Americas and the countries bordering the Mediterranean basin. The main European producers are Italy, Spain, and France and the main American producers are Argentina, Peru and the United States. In the United States, California provides nearly 100% of the U.S. crop, with about 80% of that being grown in Monterey County; there, Castroville proclaims itself to be "The Artichoke Center of the World" and holds the annual Castroville Artichoke Festival. More recently, artichokes have been grown in South Africa in a small town called Parys, located along the Vaal River.

In 2020, the world produced approximately 1.5 million tons of artichokes.

Artichokes can be produced from seeds or from vegetative means such as division, root cuttings, or micropropagation. Although technically perennials that normally produce the edible flower during only the second and subsequent years, certain varieties of artichokes can be grown from seed as annuals, producing a limited harvest at the end of the first growing season, even in regions where the plants are not normally winter-hardy. This means home gardeners in northern regions can attempt to produce a crop without the need to overwinter plants with special treatment or protection. The seed cultivar 'Imperial Star' has been bred to produce in the first year without such measures. An even newer cultivar, 'Northern Star', is said to be able to overwinter in more northerly climates, and readily survives subzero temperatures.

Commercial culture is limited to warm areas in USDA hardiness zone 7 and above. It requires good soil, regular watering and feeding, and frost protection in winter. Rooted suckers can be planted each year, so mature specimens can be disposed of after a few years, as each individual plant lives only a few years. The peak season for artichoke harvesting is the spring, but they can continue to be harvested throughout the summer, with another peak period in mid-autumn.  When harvested, they are cut from the plant so as to leave an inch or two of stem. Artichokes possess good keeping qualities, frequently remaining quite fresh for two weeks or longer under average retail conditions.

Apart from culinary applications, the globe artichoke is also an attractive plant for its bright floral display, sometimes grown in herbaceous borders for its bold foliage and large, purple flower heads.

Varieties

Traditional cultivars (vegetative propagation)
 Green, big: 'Vert de Laon' (France), 'Camus de Bretagne', 'Castel' (France), 'Green Globe' (USA, South Africa)
 Green, medium-size: 'Verde Palermo' (Sicily, Italy), 'Blanca de Tudela' (Spain), 'Argentina', 'Española' (Chile), 'Blanc d'Oran' (Algeria), 'Sakiz', 'Bayrampasha' (Turkey)
 Purple, big: 'Romanesco', 'C3' (Italy)
 Purple, medium-size: 'Violet de Provence' (France), 'Brindisino', 'Catanese', 'Niscemese' (Sicily), 'Violet d'Algerie' (Algeria), 'Baladi' (Egypt), 'Ñato' (Argentina), 'Violetta di Chioggia' (Italy)
 Spined: 'Spinoso Sardo e Ingauno' (Sardinia, Italy), 'Criolla' (Peru).
 White, in some places of the world.

Cultivars propagated by seeds
 For industry: 'Madrigal', 'Lorca', 'A-106', 'Imperial Star'
 Green: 'Symphony', 'Harmony'
 Purple: 'Concerto', 'Opal', 'Tempo'

Uses

Nutrition
Cooked unsalted artichoke is 82% water, 12% carbohydrates, 3% protein, and 3% fat (table). In a 100 gram reference serving, cooked artichoke supplies 74 calories, is a rich source (20% or more of the Daily Value, DV) of folate, and is a moderate source (10-19% DV) of vitamin K (16% DV), magnesium, sodium, and phosphorus (10-12% DV).

As food
Large globe artichokes are frequently prepared by removing all but  or so of the stem. To remove thorns, which may interfere with eating, around a quarter of each scale can be cut off. To cook, the artichoke is simmered for 15 to 30 minutes, or steamed for 30–40 minutes (less for small ones). A cooked, unseasoned artichoke has a delicate flavor.

Salt may be added to the water if boiling artichokes. Covered artichokes, in particular those that have been cut, can turn brown due to the enzymatic browning and chlorophyll oxidation. Placing them in water slightly acidified with vinegar or lemon juice can prevent the discoloration.

Leaves are often removed one at a time, and the fleshy base eaten, with vinaigrette, hollandaise, vinegar, butter, mayonnaise, aioli, lemon juice, or other sauces. The fibrous upper part of each leaf is usually discarded. The heart is eaten when the inedible choke has been peeled away from the base and discarded. The thin leaves covering the choke are also edible.

In Italy, artichoke hearts in oil are the usual vegetable for the "spring" section of the "four seasons" pizza (alongside olives for summer, mushrooms for autumn, and prosciutto for winter). A recipe well known in Rome is Jewish-style artichokes, which are deep-fried whole. The softer parts of artichokes are also eaten raw, one leaf at the time dipped in vinegar and olive oil, or thinly sliced and dressed with lemon and olive oil.

There are many stuffed artichoke recipes. A common Italian stuffing uses a mixture of bread crumbs, garlic, oregano, parsley, grated cheese, and prosciutto or sausage. A bit of the mixture is then pushed into the spaces at the base of each leaf and into the center before boiling or steaming.

In Spain, younger, smaller, and more tender artichokes are used. They can be sprinkled with olive oil and left in hot ashes in a barbecue, sautéed in olive oil with garlic, with rice as a paella, or sautéed and combined with eggs in a tortilla (frittata).

Often cited is the Greek anginares alla Polita ("artichokes city-style", referring to the city of Constantinople), a hearty, savory stew made with artichoke hearts, potatoes, and carrots, and flavored with onion, lemon, and dill. The island of Tinos, or the villages of Iria and Kantia in the Peloponnese, still very much celebrate their local production, including with a day of the artichoke or an artichoke festival.

Another way to use artichokes is to completely break off all of the leaves, leaving the bare heart. The leaves are steamed to soften the fleshy base part of each leaf to be used as the basis for any number of side dishes or appetizing dips, or the fleshy part is left attached to the heart, while the upper parts of the leaves are discarded. The remaining concave-shaped heart is often filled with meat, then fried or baked in a savory sauce. Frozen artichoke hearts are a time-saving substitute, though the consistency and stronger flavor of fresh hearts when available is preferred. Deep-fried artichoke hearts are eaten in coastal areas of California.

Throughout North Africa, the Middle East, Turkey, and Armenia, ground lamb is a favorite filling for stuffed artichoke hearts. Spices reflect the local cuisine of each country. In Lebanon, for example, the typical filling would include lamb, onion, tomato, pinenuts, raisins, parsley, dill, mint, black pepper, and allspice. A popular Turkish vegetarian variety uses only onion, carrot, green peas, and salt.  Artichokes are often prepared with white sauces or other kinds of sauces.

As a beverage

Herbal tea

Artichokes can also be made into a herbal tea. The infusion is consumed particularly among the Vietnamese for its medicinal properties; "artichoke tea" is produced as a commercial product in the Da Lat region of Vietnam. An artichoke-based herbal tea called Ceai de Anghinare is made in Romania. The flower portion is put into water and consumed as a herbal tea in Mexico. It has a slightly bitter, woody taste.

Apéritif
Artichoke is the primary botanical ingredient of the Italian aperitif Cynar, with 16.5% alcohol by volume, produced by the Campari Group.  It can be served over ice as an aperitif or as a cocktail mixed with orange juice, which is especially popular in Switzerland. It is also used to make a 'Cin Cyn', a slightly less-bitter version of the Negroni cocktail, by substituting Cynar for Campari.

Diseases
Artichoke are affected by fungal pathogens including Verticillium dahliae and Rhizoctonia solani.

Soil solarization has been successful in other crop-fungus pathosystems and is evaluated for suppression of V. dahliae and R. solani by Guerrero et al. 2019.

Genome 
The globe artichoke genome has been sequenced. The genome assembly covers 725 of the 1,084 Mb genome and the sequence codes for about 27,000 genes. An understanding of the genome structure is an important step in understanding traits of the globe artichoke, which may aid in the identification of economically important genes from related species.

References

External links
 
 

Cynareae
Inflorescence vegetables
Medicinal plants of Africa
Medicinal plants of Asia
Medicinal plants of Europe
Perennial vegetables
Taxa named by Carl Linnaeus
Symbols of California